Salas is a Spanish surname.

Salas may also refer to:

Places
 Isla Salas y Gómez, island in the Polynesian Triangle
 Salas (parish), in northern Spain
 Salas (Galiza), a tributary of the Lima, through Spain and Portugal
 Salas, Asturias, a municipality in northern Spain
 Salas, Riga, a neighborhood in Riga, Latvia
 Salas District, Lambayeque, Peru
 Salas District, Ica, Peru
 Julio César Salas Municipality, Mérida, Venezuela

Other uses
 Benito Salas Airport, Neiva, Colombia

See also
 Sala (disambiguation)
 Salaš (disambiguation)